Jesús Andrés Ramírez Díaz (born 4 May 1998) is a Venezuelan footballer who plays for Portuguese club Marítimo as a striker.

Career
He came to Chile after playing two years for Veracruz Premier until 2018, but he couldn't join Coquimbo Unido U19 on first half 2019 due to his age. On second half 2019, he joined the Pirates on a deal for three years. On 2020 season, he was loaned to Audax Italiano for one year. On second half 2021, he was loaned to Mexican club Atlético Morelia in the Liga de Expansión MX.

References

External links
 

Living people
1998 births
Association football forwards
Venezuelan footballers
Venezuelan expatriate footballers
Estudiantes de Mérida players
C.D. Veracruz footballers
Coquimbo Unido footballers
Audax Italiano footballers
Atlético Morelia players
C.S. Marítimo players
Liga Premier de México players
Chilean Primera División players
Primera B de Chile players
Liga de Expansión MX players
Expatriate footballers in Mexico
Venezuelan expatriate sportspeople in Mexico
Venezuelan expatriates in Mexico
Expatriate footballers in Chile
Venezuelan expatriate sportspeople in Chile
Venezuelan expatriates in Chile